Kerim Palić (born 24 January 1997) is a Bosnian professional footballer who plays as a midfielder for Uzbekistan Super League club Metallurg Bekabad.

References

External links

1997 births
Living people
Footballers from Sarajevo
Bosnia and Herzegovina footballers
Association football midfielders
FK Bosna Sarajevo players
FK Inter Bratislava players
FK Krupa players
FK Sarajevo players
PFK Metallurg Bekabad players
Premier League of Bosnia and Herzegovina players
First League of the Republika Srpska players
Uzbekistan Super League players